The U.S. state of Mississippi first required its residents to register their motor vehicles and display license plates in 1912. Since then, the state has gone through a variety of license plate designs and currently has several different designs for passenger, non-passenger, and optional-issue plates.

Plates are currently issued by the Vehicle Licensing Division of the Mississippi Department of Revenue. Only rear plates have been required since 1925.

Passenger baseplates

1912 to 1976 
The first Mississippi license plate that complied with these standards was issued 22 years beforehand, in 1934.

1976 to present

County coding

Non-passenger plates

Optional / specialty plates 
Many different specialty tags are available. In fiscal year 2014, a total of 2,749,315 license plates were issued by counties, with 683,550 being specialty plates such as: 165,849 Antique (vehicles older than 25 years), 100,698 disabled, 78,714 vanity or personalized plates, 18,367 MS State University, and 15,596 University of Mississippi.

As of July 2022, most specialty plates have a $33 fee, but college or university plates are $53.  The state government has a revenue sharing deal with organizations sponsoring a specialty plate, which can be as small as a single high school.  For 2014, $5,113,035 was paid to such organizations.

References

External links 
 Available License Plates - Mississippi Department of Revenue
 Mississippi license plates, 1969–present

Mississippi
Transportation in Mississippi
Mississippi transportation-related lists